Arniko Awasiya Secondary School is one of the oldest educational institutions in  Biratnagar as well as in the Eastern Development Region. It was established on 2nd of Poush, 2033 B.S. in Nepali Calendar. It was established by Mr. Raj Bahadur Kunwar and his wife Mrs. Kamala Kunwar. It is located in peace loving part of Biratnagar known as "Tintoliya" in ward no 13.

Schools in Nepal